China Insurance may refer to:
 People's Insurance Company of China, the only insurance company of Mainland China before the 1980s
 , formerly China Insurance Company, Limited, a former overseas subsidiary of People's Insurance Company of China, now a separate conglomerate 
 China Taiping Insurance Holdings, formerly China Insurance International Holdings, a subsidiary of China Taiping Insurance Group Limited, a listed company

See also
 China Life Insurance Company
 Insurance industry in China
 China Insurance Regulatory Commission